The Cessna Citation Mustang is a very light jet that was built by Cessna.
Launched at the 2002 NBAA convention, the Model 510 first flew on April 23, 2005. It received its FAA type certification on September 8, 2006, and was first delivered on November 22. Production ended in 2017 after 479 aircraft were built.

Development

Launched at the 2002 NBAA convention, the $2.4 million Mustang first flew on April 23, 2005. The airplane received full type certification from the Federal Aviation Administration on September 8, 2006. Cessna received FAA certification to fly into "known icing conditions" on November 9, 2006. Cessna delivered the first production LJ on November 22, 2006, the same day the FAA awarded Cessna with the necessary certification. Dave and Dawn Goode of GOODE Ski Technologies received the first retail delivered Cessna Mustang on April 23, 2007.

In 2010, Cessna launched an enhanced edition of the aircraft called the High Sierra, which features higher-quality cabin furnishings and enhanced avionics, including synthetic vision.
In 2015, its unit cost was US$3.35 million.

Cessna ended production of the design in May 2017 due to lack of customer demand for the aircraft as a result of competition from the company's own Cessna Citation M2. The company had been selling an average of 40 Mustangs per year until the M2 was introduced in 2013, and then Mustang sales dropped to just 24 aircraft over the next three years. The M2 is a faster and larger aircraft, but it can operate from similar-length runways and requires the more-common C/E-525 type rating, which potentially reduces training and crewing costs over the Mustang. A total of 479 examples of the Citation Mustang were produced.

In 2018, used 2009-2016 Mustangs were priced at $1.85-2.5 million.

Design

 
The Mustang is a low-wing, cantilever monoplane with a swept wing, T-tail, and retractable tricycle gear. One main door is located in the forward left section of the aircraft, with an additional emergency exit on the center right section of the fuselage.
In its standard configuration, the Mustang has four passenger seats in the aft cabin, a toilet, and seating for two in the cockpit. 
The airframe is primarily of aluminum alloy construction and has a three-spar wing.
Power is provided by two Pratt & Whitney Canada PW615F turbofans mounted in pods on the aft fuselage.
The aircraft was built at the Cessna production facility in Independence, Kansas.
Like many other light jets, the Mustang is approved for single-pilot operation.

Specifications

Operators

Half of the fleet is in the U.S. and Canada, mostly operated by firms or individuals owning a single aircraft and typically flown by their owners, with some owners defraying a portion of the fixed operating costs by sharing use with air charters. Outside of North America, most are exclusively flown by third-party crews. Most of the other half of the fleet is registered in Europe: 23 aircraft in the British Isles, 20 aircraft in Austria, 20 in France, 11 in Germany, six in the Czech Republic, five in Switzerland and four in Italy. In Latin America, Brazil has 31 aircraft, there are 10 in Mexico, three in Argentina, two in Venezuela and one each in Chile, Guatemala, Panama and Paraguay. In the Middle East four are in Turkey, as in Egypt and two are in Israel. Six are in Africa, nine in Australia and five in New Zealand.

Accidents
 On Thursday, 14 December 2017, OE-FWD operated by Skytaxi Luftfahrt from Egelsbach Airport crashed approaching to Friedrichshafen Airport, Germany, 15 km from the runway, killing the lone passenger and the two crewmembers including its captain, company CEO and chief pilot Adi Anderst. This was the type's first fatal accident and its first major accident in a decade.

See also

References

External links

 Manufacturer's website
 FAA Type Certificate A00014WI 

Citation Mustang
2000s United States business aircraft
Twinjets
Low-wing aircraft
Very light jets
Mustang
T-tail aircraft
Aircraft first flown in 2005